Marsha Garces Williams (born June 18, 1956) is an American film producer and philanthropist. She was married to actor and comedian Robin Williams from 1989 to 2010.

Early life 
Marsha Lynn Garces was born in Milwaukee, Wisconsin. She grew up in Shorewood, Wisconsin, and attended Shorewood High School. Garces' father, Leon Garces, was Filipino and born in Ubay, Bohol, who moved to the United States in 1929. He later served in the United States Navy during World War II. Her mother, Ina Rachel Mattila, was Finnish.

Personal life and career 
Garces married Robin Williams on April 30, 1989, following the 1988 divorce from his first wife, Valerie. Garces became pregnant with Williams' child late in 1988, and the pair were later married on April 30, 1989. Garces met Williams in 1984 when she was employed as a nanny for Williams's son Zachary. Previously, Garces was a painter working as a waitress. According to his first wife, the romantic relationship between Robin and Marsha began after they separated. During their marriage, they had two children, Zelda Rae and Cody Alan, born in 1989 and 1991, respectively. In March 2008, she filed for divorce from Williams citing irreconcilable differences. Their divorce was finalized in 2010.

After working as the family's nanny, Garces worked with Williams as his personal assistant on films such as Good Morning, Vietnam (1987) and Dead Poets Society (1989). She was later the producer for several of Williams's films. Together, they founded a film production company, Blue Wolf Productions, in 1991. 

Garces Williams has been involved philanthropically with organizations such as Doctors Without Borders and Seacology.

Filmography 
1993 – Mrs. Doubtfire
1998 – Patch Adams
1999 – Jakob the Liar
2002 – Robin Williams: Live on Broadway
2014 – Extinction Soup

Awards 
1993 – Golden Globe Award for Best Motion Picture – Musical or Comedy – Mrs Doubtfire
2003 – Nominated for a Primetime Emmy Award for Outstanding Variety, Music, or Comedy Special – Robin Williams: Live on Broadway

References

External links 
 

1956 births
American film producers
American people of Finnish descent
American people of Filipino descent
American philanthropists
American women film producers
Businesspeople from Milwaukee
Film producers from California
Golden Globe Award-winning producers
Living people
People from San Francisco
Robin Williams
Shorewood High School (Wisconsin) alumni